State Road 32 (SR 32) in the U.S. state of Indiana is an east–west state highway in central Indiana that crosses the entire state, covering a distance of about . The western terminus of SR 32 is at the Illinois state line, southeast of Danville, Illinois, where the state highway becomes a county road. The eastern terminus is at Union City, Indiana, and Union City, Ohio, at the Ohio state border where the highway  becomes Ohio State Route 47.

Route description

Between the Illinois state line and Crawfordsville, the highway runs somewhat parallel to Interstate 74.  East of Crawfordsville, the highway is a popular alternate route for traffic from parts north and northeast of Indianapolis heading for westbound I-74.

Between I-65 and Fishersburg, Indiana, SR 32 travels through Boone, Hamilton, and Madison counties. Continuing east from Fishersburg, SR 32 serves the towns of Lapel, Anderson, Muncie, Winchester, and Union City.

The vast majority of SR 32 is rural and undivided.  Portions of SR 32 between Muncie and Selma are divided.

Major intersections

References

External links

032
Transportation in Vermillion County, Indiana
Transportation in Fountain County, Indiana
Transportation in Montgomery County, Indiana
Transportation in Boone County, Indiana
Transportation in Hamilton County, Indiana
Transportation in Madison County, Indiana
Transportation in Delaware County, Indiana
Transportation in Randolph County, Indiana